Wo bist du Licht! (English: Where are You Light!) is a 1981 piece for mixed orchestra, mezzo-soprano and tape by Canadian composer Claude Vivier. Vivier completed the piece in early 1981, on a commission from the Canadian Broadcasting Corporation. It is dedicated to Rober Racine. The notes given by Vivier in the finished manuscript describe it as follows: "A meditation on human suffering, this piece is intended as one long continuous melody. The music can be perceived from three different aspects: formal, melodic, or textual."

Instrumentation

Percussion
Balinese gong
Chinese gong
Tam-tam
Tubular bells
Drum brakes
Magnetic tape
Strings
11 Violins
4 Violas
3 Cellos
2 Basses
Voice
Mezzo-Soprano

References

Citations

Sources
 
 

1981 compositions
Compositions by Claude Vivier
Compositions that use extended techniques